Tun Tun Oo (also spelled Htun Htun Oo; born 22 January 1961) is a Burmese politician currently serves as Amyotha Hluttaw MP for Mandalay Region  № 2 Constituency.

Early life and education
Tun was born on 22 January 1961 in Mandalay, Myanmar. He graduated with a BEng (Electrical Power) from Rangoon Institute of Technology (RIT). His previous job was as a consultant engineer.

Political career
He is a member of the National League for Democracy Party politician, he was elected as an Amyotha Hluttaw MP, winning a majority of 344315 votes and elected
representative for Mandalay Region № 2 parliamentary constituency.

References

National League for Democracy politicians
1961 births
Living people
People from Mandalay